Aliidiomarina soli is a Gram-negative, non-spore-forming and motile bacterium from the genus of Aliidiomarina which has been isolated from saline-alkaline soil from the Inner Mongolia in China.

References

External links
Type strain of Aliidiomarina soli at BacDive -  the Bacterial Diversity Metadatabase

Bacteria described in 2017
Alteromonadales